Mequinenza (Aragonese and ) or Mequinensa is a town and municipality of the province of Zaragoza, in the autonomous community of Aragon, Spain. It is located beside the river Segre, close to its confluence with the river Ebro between the Mequinenza Dam and Riba-roja reservoir.

Its reservoir, known also as Mar de Aragón, built between 1957 and 1964, has a capacity of 1,530,000,000 m³ and is one of the largest in the country. It has a regatta field for rowing and canoeing considered one of the best in Europe for its excellent accessibility and its stable level of water. San Blas and Santa Águeda Festivities take place in February and are considered a Festival of Tourist Interest in Aragon.

Name 
The name comes from Miknasa, a Berber tribe that built a defensive settlement at Mequinenza Castle in the 8th century. It was Latinized as Miquinencia and appears differently in the documentation until the 19th century, alternating the forms Mquinensa, Miquinença, Mequinença, Mequinensa or Mequinenza. The population is known also as "lo poble". In Spanish the place name is Mequinenza and in Catalan Mequinensa.

History and features
Mequinenza is located where the ancient Iberian city of Octogesa once stood, that played an important role in the battle of Ilerda that took place in June 49 BC between the forces of Julius Caesar and the Spanish army of Pompey Magnus. Since 1983 and as part of the research programs of the Museum of Zaragoza and the collaboration with the City Council of Mequinenza three main sites have been excavated by archeologists: Los Castellets, Barranco de la Mina Vallfera and Riols I.

 Los Castellets: a key site for the knowledge of the transition of the peoples of the Late Bronze Age to the Urnfield culture. The site consists of a colony on a stirrup in the river Ebro, surrounded by two towers, a wall and a ditch, next to two necropolis.
 Barranco de la Mina Vallfera: an emergency excavation campaign was carried out on this site, discovering a very important group of necropolis and final Neolithic dating.
 Riols I. In October 1985, the first emergency excavation campaign was carried out, describing a settlement similar to that of Barranco de la Mina Vallfera. The conservation of this deposit allowed to initiate the studies that indicated that it dated from the final period of the Neolithic.

Numerous associated paintings and engravings have been found in Mequinenza, belonging to the Rock art of the Iberian Mediterranean Basin, considered a World Heritage Site by UNESCO in 1998: Barranco de Campells I, Barranco de Campells II, Barranco de La Plana I, Barranco de La Plana II, Camino de la Cova Plana I, Camino de la Cova Plana II, Mas de Patriciel I, Roca de Marta, Sierra de los Rincones I, Valmayor IV, Valmayor V, Val de Caballé, Val de Mamet I, Val de Mamet II and Vallbufandes I.

Antiquity and Middle Age 
In Roman times the old Octogesa was settled and would be located near the actual place of the town. During the decay of the Roman Empire, Octogesa was conquered by the Gothic army and later conquered by the Berber tribe of the Miknasa, which would give its name to the town. It was known in Andalusian times as Miknasa al-Zaytun, or Miknasa of the Olives, a title also given to Meknes, a Moroccan city of the same etymology. It is believed that Miknasa al-Zaytun was settled between the year 714 and 719. During this time it is built a small tower defense. Al-Idrisi, chronicler of the time, describes it like this:    "It is small, but it has a strong fortress of strong aspect and it is in the borders of al-Ándalus".With the Reconquista, the first attempt to besiege Mequinenza in 1133 by Alfonso the Battaler was successful and, although the Almoravids reconquered the town the following year. Mequinenza is definitively won by the Christians on 24 October 1149 by a Catalan-Aragonese army. Mequinenza, after half a century of direct royal jurisdiction, was a manor of the house of the Moncada, together with Aitona and Seròs. And these are the ones that build the important Castle of Mequinenza. Although the Christian conquest still stood, the three villages were mostly Muslim. Years later conflicts between Fraga and Mequinenza arise because of their border boundaries. On 6 September 1246, to avoid battles and litigation, Pere de Moncada and his wife Sibila proceeded to muddle these terms.

Mequinenza did not avoid the plague of 1348, which causes many victims on this occasion and also in epidemic outbreaks since 1380. As a result, from 1381 to 1387, the infant Juan el Cazador remains on several occasions in the castle. In 1410, after the death without descendants of Martin of Aragon and during the successive disputes that led to the Commitment of Caspe, the supporters of Count Jaime de Urgel in the kingdom of Aragon organized their own parliament in Mequinenza, in opposition to the parliament of Alcañiz loyal to Fernando de Trastámara.

Modern and contemporary age 
Between the 15th and 16th centuries, a time of misery and hunger happens with several revolts due to the oppression of some gentlemen. In the year 1697 Fray Miguel de Salas writes the book "Vida de Santa Agathoclia, virgin and martyr, patron of Mequinenza". During the reign of Carlos II were devekioed silkworm farming industries that would continue active until the arrival of the War of succession in 1705. Different wars such as the Catalan Civil War (1462–1472) and different Spanish internal battles in also devastated the town and the castle during the 16th and 17th centuries.

In 1810 during the Napoleonic invasion, General Louis-Gabriel Suchet -as Ramon Berenguer IV did in 1149- conquered Mequinenza, Fraga and Lerida. This facilitates the conquest of the whole of the Bajo Cinca and the Segriá regions, and as a result of this figure "Mequinenza" in the Arc de Triomphe of Paris as one of the great victories of Napoleon. In 1812 Mequinenza became part of the French department of the Bouches of the Ebro. Mequinenza was recovered for the Spaniards by troops of General Copons in 1814 thanks to an audacious stratagem of the adventurer Juan Van Halen. In 1831 the town and the castle already belonged to the Dukes of Medinaceli.

Once again under the rule of the Bourbons, the strategic castle of Mequinenza and its surroundings were transformed and conditioned again to adapt to new forms of warfare with artillery and infantry equipped with rifles. The Duke of Orléans also ordered to expand and strengthen the road parallel to the Ebro river that connected Mequinenza with Tortosa. In the enlightened environment of the mid-18th century in Spain, José Ferrer Beltrán was born in Mequinenza, a priest who stood out for his role as a musician as an organist for the cathedrals of Lérida, Pamplona and Oviedo. He also became a close friend of the Asturian politician Gaspar Melchor de Jovellanos. The old undiscovered city of Octogesa also attracted many adventurers as the French diplomat and writer Jean-François de Bourgoing that evoked the possible link between the Mequinenza town and the Roman Octogesa of Julius Caesar.

At the dawn of the 19th century, the economic situation of Mequinenza had not changed substantially and agriculture continued to be the main economic source. Mudejar irrigation techniques and large treadmills were still used close to the Ebro river. In 1802, Charles IV granted the consent for the construction in Mequinenza of a new parish church, designed by the architect José de Yarza in the Neo-Renaissance style. The works began in 1802 and lasted until 1808.

Spanish War of Independence and the siege of Mequinenza 

During the Spanish War of Independence, within the Napoleonic Wars the siege of Mequinenza began on 15 May 1810. Despite having only a castle with few defenses, the town and its castle were located in a strategic point for the Napoleonic army to ensure the navigation of the Ebro and the use of the town as a supply and transport base for subsequent military operations. The first attack on the population was in mid-March after the capture of Fraga, although population defenders under the command of Colonel Manuel Carbón rejected the attack. After this first failed attempt, the French high command changed its strategy seeking the peaceful surrender of the castle.

Failed this attempt to surrender the square by peaceful route, the French army again opted for the military route. After the capture of Lérida, General Louis-Gabriel Suchet in command of the 3rd Army Corps ordered General Musnier to assault Mequinenza with his division. The siege began on 19 May and days later Musnier's troops were joined by those from the Mont-Marie brigade, stationed on the right bank of the Ebro and those of General Rogniat, who reinforced the siege with engineers, sappers and miners. The attackers numbered about 16,000 men, four engineer companies and two artillery with 14 pieces. The Spanish defense of the square, at the hands of Colonel Carbón, had a total of 1,200 men. On 2 June, French engineers had already started digging trenches and located artillery pieces to attack the castle while the infantry stormed the town at the same time. The Spanish garrison left the town on the night of 3 June and took refuge in the castle. On the night of 4 to 5 June, the second battalion of the first Vistula regiment erected a square tower armed with artillery. The same night the population is taken and eight pieces of cannon, four hundred rifles, fifteen barrels of gunpowder and four barges. The head of the Polish battalion Chlusowitz and the French sapper captain Foucaud lead the attack.

With the town taken, General Suchet goes to the siege of the castle. On the night of 7 to 8 June, the artillery commanded by Battalion Chief Raffron, assembled three new batteries and the fire of sixteen artillery pieces begins at the start of the day. General Carbon's defenders respond vigorously by destroying three pieces, though French fire continues to dent the defenses. Finally a part of the main walls succumbs and the projectiles begin to reach the center of the castle. The attack is joined by the French shooters parapeted with bags of sand. On the 8th at 10 o'clock in the morning, the Spanish garrison, after offering great resistance during all the night, fought back and finally flew the white flag. The garrison gains the honor of parading in front of General Musnier's division and lays down its weapons in front of the glacis of the Mequinenza Castle. The Spanish troops at that time were 500 soldiers of various origins: Navarrese-Aragonese, Catalans, smugglers, Miquelets, adventurers and a regiment commanded by an Englishman named Doyle who held the rank of Commissar General of Aragon. Inside the castle the French found five mortars, four hundred thousand English-made cartridges, thirty thousand gunpowder as well as food for three months.

Mequinenza was incorporated into the French department of Bouches-de-l'Èbre. The French Mequinenza would not last long and in 1814 it would be recovered again for the Spanish thanks to the Spanish soldier and adventurer of Flemish origin Juan Van Halen. As a consequence of these military contests, the name "Mequinenza" appears on the Arc de Triomphe in Paris as one of the great Napoleonic victories in Spain.

The British military man and artist Edward Hawke Locker describes the population in 1824 in his work "Views from Spain" after one of his trips around Spain:

"The Segre which rises in the Pyrenees at the distance of 120 miles, and traverses some of the richest plains of Cataluña, falls into the Ebro, beneath the walls of Mequinenza, which stands on the confluence of these two rivers, and of the Cinca, which also becomes tributary to the Ebro, near the same spot. Mequinenza is a fortified town os fome consecuence, though its population does not exceed 1500 souls."

In Mequinenza returns to be place of importance during the Carlist Wars and later in the War of the Matiners. In 1841, the adventurer and businessman Enrico Misley promoted the Ebro Steamer Company with the aim of establishing a transportation service between Zaragoza and Barcelona divided into sections, using coal from the Mequinenza mines as fuel for Steamships. Misley's company ended up failing for political and economic reasons, although it meant a starting point in the concession and exploitation of the first mining demarcations of the Mequinenza coal basin.

Spanish Civil War and the Battle of the Ebro in Mequinenza 

In the course of the Spanish Civil War in 1936–1939, Mequinenza and its municipal area were the scene of bloody combats of the Battle of the Ebro, between June and November 1938. The Auts were the scene of violent fighting during the initial phase of the battle of the Ebro, where the 42nd Republican Division began to cross the Ebro river in this area on the morning of 25 July. The plan of the operation of the Mequinenza-Fayón by the Republican Army was to cross the Ebro river and the conquest a bridgehead. The balance of the battle of the Auts was one of the bloodiest in the entire battle of the Ebro. On the republican side, 817 dead and 1,328 prisoners, not counting the wounded and disappeared (about 3,000 casualties), and by the Francoist Army, 135 dead and 1284 wounded. The objective of the republican offensive was to fix the enemy's reserves and cut the road from Mequinenza to Maella. This knot, however, was never conquered. To the initial effort of the 226 Brigade and part of the 227 Brigade of the 42nd Republican Division, the Francoists replied with the progressive arrival of reinforcements. The offensive continued day after day with no significant progress despite heavy fighting. On 1 August, a double aerial and artillery bombardment preceded a first counterattack by Francoist forces. The republicans would attack again two days in a last attempt to conquer the long-awaited 'Gilbert Crossing', while on 6 August there was a definitive counterattack by the Francoist army, forcing the republican army to defend itself, avoiding the collapse of the entire division. Finally, the survivors of the 42nd Republican Division had to cross the Ebro again in the opposite direction. As a consequence of the Battle of the Ebro, the bridge over the Ebro in Mequinenza was destroyed.

Six decades after the events, on 8 August 1998, the group of republican survivors of the "Quinta del Biberón" inaugurated the monument erected on the hillside of Alto de los Auts, a key position, the highest and most strongly defended by the Republicans. The monument, designed by Javier Torres, is presided over by two plates, in Catalan and Spanish, and two helmets on each side. The plaque says: 'To all those who lost, who were all'. Up to 250 combatants accompanied by their families participated in the homage. After depositing a wreath at the foot of the monument, the veterans recalled the thirst, heat and diseases they suffered during the combats.

20th century

The development of the Mequinenza coalfield 
The arrival of the twentieth century led to an increase in the demand for coal, and the development of the Mequinenza coal basin. The first initial exploitations were totally underground through galleries and inclined planes depending on the coal levels. Originally, the wagons were used with animal traction until around 1920, when they began to be replaced by mechanical and electrical traction.

In 1880 Carbonífera del Ebro company was founded, which would become the most important company in the Mequinenza basin. The growth was focused on Mequinenza since it was the natural epicenter of the basin although it also grew nearby towns such as La Granja d'Escarp, Torrente de Cinca or Fayón. In twenty years, from 1900 to 1920, the town grew from 2,400 inhabitants to 4,200, mostly men. An avalanche that was repeated again in the 1940s. The numbers are imprecise, but in 1945 the chief engineer of the Zaragoza district stated that the mining population, among workers and family, was 4,132 people. There were three main mining colonies called Virgen del Pilar, Previsión and Electroquímica de Flix. The mining colonies of Mequinenza came to host more than 900 people in 1945. Mequinenza became a mining town where Aragonese miners arrived (from Andorra, Utrillas, Montalbán, Alcorisa or Aliaga) and also from Asturias, Andalusia, Murcia and Galicia. Mining transformed the local community and modified also the traditional economic activity, based on rainfed agriculture.

Towpath 

Llauts, traditional wooden boats about 20 or 25 meters long, were essential to transport up to 30 tons of lignite on each trip. Constructed of local hardwood, the llauts used the current of the river to make the journey south, and when they had to return to Mequinenza they could use wind extending the square sails that the skipper maneuvered. When the wind was not blowing enough or it was contrary, the llauts had to climb the towpath, that is, pulling them from the shore upstream This was known as "Camí de Sirga" (or towpath in English). Until 1914 the towpath was made by three men for each llaut that were relieved every hour and a half or two hours. Carbonífera del Ebro made an attempt to incorporate steamships to transport lignite, but the Ebro's drainage and its complicated orography made its use too difficult. Flix Electrochemical Society (SEQF), which had mining concessions in Mequinenza, decided in 1920 to suppress the human force and change it for animal traction. This was a unique transport system in the world, in which the coal that was extracted from the mines, led to different landings at the foot of the river and transported by river route to Tortosa or Fayón.

World War I 

The favorable situation of the years of the World War I where the basin extracted up to 30% of the national coal, allowed to accumulate enough capital in the companies of the coal basin to start a second modernization during 1924 and 1925. Compressed air and electricity were introduced into the mines, a fact that allowed the coal extraction capacity to be further increased. In the late 1950s, the Mequinenza miners saw their jobs threatened in part by the construction of the Mequinenza and Riba-roja reservoirs, which would flood the mining galleries. In the mid-1970s, great changes were introduced in the coal exploitation systems, going from small galleries to much larger galleries, using new and safer systems that allowed higher extraction yields.

End of coal era 

In 2010, MIBSA (Minera del Bajo Segre), which shared coal mining operations on the border between the province of Lleida and Mequinenza, closed. At that time, the company had more than 130 kilometers of galleries in its concessions. In 2013, Carbonífera del Ebro suffered a serious economic setback due to Endesa's refusal to burn the coal of Mequinenza at the Escucha power station, leaving the future of Carbonífera del Ebro and all the direct and indirect jobs in Mequinenza in the air. The staff of the mining company undertook various mobilizations actively participating in the Black March towards Madrid, remembering with pride "that since 1880 they had fed the factories of the industrial belt of Barcelona". After months of waiting in 2014, Carbonífera del Ebro announced that the situation was unsustainable and was closing its doors under the non-competitive Mine Closure Plan of the Ministry of Industry.

From the old town to the new Mequinenza

The construction of the Ribarroja and the Mequinenza dam meant the disappearance of most of the urban area and, consequently, the tragic end of the ancient town. Although the waters of the reservoir did not completely cover the urban nucleus, they did deny most of the riverside farmlands. The disappearance of the urban layout meant a radical change of life for its neighbors who, in addition to abandoning their homes and witnessing their demolition, also saw the disappearance of an economy based on industry, coal mining and fluvial commerce. The only building in the old town of Mequinenza that was preserved was the María Quintana School Group that today it's the headquarters of the Museums of Mequinenza.  Mequinenza was reborn again due to the tenacity and effort of its inhabitants, who built the new town a few kilometers from the old town. Modern and touristic, the new Mequinenza has become a world benchmark for active and sports tourism, as well as an outstanding cultural hub in the Bajo Cinca region.

Touristic sites and heritage

Mequinenza Castle 

The building rises almost to the edge of a great precipice, being a closed mass of quite height, its plant is an irregular quadrilateral, with seven rectangular turrets except one, the more robust, that is curiously of pentagonal plant. Two towers flank the small door that is semicircular, under shield and protected by a bollard. Few forts will have a better location than this, contemplating a vast and impressive landscape, almost geological, on the confluence of the Ebro, Segre and Cinca rivers and their surrounding lands. It is not surprising that the Moncada, masters of the barony of Mequinenza chose this nest of eagles for their fortified mansion. The building is an authentic Castle-Palace, one of the best that Gothic art bequeathed to the Crown of Aragon, dating to the fourteenth and fifteenth centuries.

In its beginnings it was an Arab fortress, built by the Berber tribe of the Miknasa towards the 12th century. In which at the end of several conquests, it falls into the hands of Ramon Berenguer IV, passing definitively to the hands of Christians. After several changes of owner, in 1184 the castle and the town of Mequinenza, the Marquis of Aitona, Ramón Guillén de Moncada, and later to the Dukes of Medinaceli (Duchess of Alba) are granted. But until the fifteenth century the first reforms were not introduced to convert the military fortress into residence-palace.

Much later, during the years 1700–1710 (War of Succession) in which there was a change of dynasty in Spain (of the Austrias to the Bourbons) was transformed and conditioned the castle and the environs to a new form of war (with firearms, artillery, etc.) and this was the moment when the Duke of Orleans ordered a road from Mequinenza to Tortosa to be built parallel to the river to guard all the barges (llauts) river between these two populations.

During the period 1808–1814 (War of Independence) the castle endured three attacks by Napoleón, but finally in 1810 was conquered by the troops of Marshal Suchet, and belonged until 1814 to the French government. (Mequinenza happened to be inscribed in large letters in one of the outer columns in the Arc de Triomphe of Paris.) But in February of that same year and without firing a single shot it returned to Spanish hands by means of a more espionage strategy of Van Halen. Between 1820 and 1823 acquired an important paper, supporting important Carlist attacks and conserving military garrison that lasted until principles of the century XX in which it is abandoned. During the civil war it happens to be a castle of republican observation and prison and once finished the war is in ruins until the company ENHER reconstructs it in the decade of years 50.

Currently the castle is owned by the ENDESA Foundation. To visit the castle it is necessary to request the visit in advance in the Office of Tourism of the City council of Mequinenza. Guided tours are held on Tuesday mornings with prior request.

The building rises almost to the edge of a great precipice, being a closed mass of quite height, its plant is an irregular quadrilateral, with seven rectangular turrets except one, the more robust, that is curiously of pentagonal plant. Two towers flank the small door that is semicircular, under shield and protected by a bollard. Few fortresses will have a better location than this one, contemplating a vast and impressive landscape, almost geological, on the confluence of the rivers Ebro, Segre, and Cinca and the old town.

Old town of Mequinenza 

The town of Mequinenza was situated on the left bank of the river Ebro, and endured the riots of a capricious river that flooded the lower parts of the town when they appeared. Thanks to the Ebro River, Mequinenza established a full-fledged river trade, which gave prestige not only to Mequinenza carpenters but also to the "struts". In the period of splendor, a fleet of 16 llaüts (boats carrying between 18 and 30 tons) was reached. During the last century, its main means of life has been coal, although in recent years there has been a sharp decline in activity.

With the arrival of the company ENHER, life changed for the majority of people, going from having 4033 registered inhabitants to having 5800 registered and about 1500 more uncounted. Many of them were workers from other localities to work on the construction of the Mequinenza dam. The mines began to close due to the significant increase in the water level of the Ribarroja dam. Thus began an exodus for the inhabitants of Mequinenza in which some went abroad to work in the mining, others to different points of the Spanish geography and a majority stayed in that at the moment is Mequinenza.

By the end of 1974 the majority of the population had already settled in their new homes. Mequinenza probably became the first town of Spain in which all its inhabitants were the owners of their houses. It is not surprising that the Moncada, masters of the barony of Mequinenza chose this nest of eagles for their fortified mansion. The building is an authentic Castle-Palace, one of the best that Gothic art bequeathed to the Crown of Aragon, dating to the fourteenth and fifteenth centuries.

In its beginnings it was an Arab fortress, built by the Berber tribe of the Miknasa towards the 12th century. In which at the end of several conquests, it falls into the hands of Ramon Berenguer IV, passing definitively to the hands of Christians. After several changes of owner, in 1184 the castle and the town of Mequinenza, the Marquis of Aitona, Ramón Guillén de Moncada, and later to the Dukes of Medinaceli (Duchess of Alba) are granted.

Museums of Mequinenza 

In the Museums of Mequinenza, you can explore an underground gallery of coal of more than 1000 meters of route in the Museum of the Mine, to cross the history of the population until the disappearance of the Mequinenza under the waters of the river Ebro in the Museum of History or discover how lived during Prehistory in the Museum of the Prehistoric Past. Opened in 2006, they are located at Maria Quintana School Group.

The Museums of Mequinenza center their collection in the historical, cultural and industrial past of Mequinenza, that was flooded under the waters of the Ebro. Today you can visit part of the old town, the medieval castle of the city and a coal mine of more than one kilometer in length with historical material and machines that have been used for the extraction of coal for more than 150 years in the Mequinenza mining basin. "Camí de Sirga" lodge is also located next to the Museums, which collects the name of the old route used by the boats to go up the river Ebro with the llaüts, some boats that could carry 30 tons of coal.

Jesús Moncada 

Jesús Moncada i Estruga was a narrator and translator born in Mequinenza in 1941. His work is a re-creation, somewhere between realism and fantasy, of the mythical past of the old town of Mequinenza now submerged beneath the waters of the river Ebro. Considered one of the most important Catalan authors of his time, he received various prizes for his work, among them the Premio Ciutat de Barcelona and the Premio Nacional de la Crítica in 1989 for Camí de sirga (The Towpath) and the Creu de Sant Jordi, awarded by the Generalitat de Catalunya in 2001. In 2004—a few months before his death—he received the Premio de las Letras Aragonesas. Moncada is one of the most recognized and translated authors of Catalan literature. Camí de sirga has been translated into fifteen languages, among them Japanese and Vietnamese. He also translated into Catalan many Spanish, French, and English works of authors such as Guillaume Apollinaire, Alexandre Dumas, père, Jules Verne, and Boris Vian."Moncada blends the real and the fantastic in the manner of Gabriel García Márquez, and his episodic style may remind some readers of the Colombian novelist's treatment of events in the town of Macondo in One Hundred Years of Solitude. Such a comparison is not mere reviewers' hyperbole: this is a rich, humorous and moving novel, sensitively translated into English, which should herald a glittering future for its author."

Euan Cameron. "Rich view from the banks of the Ebro", Review of "The Towpath", The EuropeanThe novel Camí de Sirga (The towpath) (1988) tells the story of a town situated at the confluence of two great rivers, the Ebro and the Segre, through the memories of its inhabitants. This avalanche of memories piles up until the 20th century, and is provoked by the construction of a reservoir and the imminent flooding of the town. The book also contains some reflections about history, memory, fiction and about the lies they all involve. The general tone is nostalgic, without being bitter, but some of the personalities and situations are also comic. It evokes the hypocrisy and cruelty of human relations in a town in which everyone knows everybody, the influence of history -the First World War in Europe and the Spanish Civil War- on the history of Mequinenza and the economic system at work in the town and the Ebro valley.

Natural spaces

Aragon Sea - "Mar de Aragón"

The town is most well known amongst northern European fishermen for the large but elusive Wels catfish (Silurus glanis), which are found in the vast Mequinenza reservoir. Along with the traditional cyprinid fishing, the sporty and technical black bass fishing grows here. Catfish, introduced in Mequinenza in the spring of 1974, have also been incorporated into the carp, carp and alburno, the most abundant and most fished species, capturing specimens of more than one hundred kilos and more than two meters of length.

Built in 1966 on the Ebro river, it has an area of 7,540 hectares of water surface, being the largest reservoir in Aragon. Its volume reaches 1530 hm³, dedicated to the production of electrical energy. It has an average width of 600 meters and its depth can exceed 60 meters. The dam is 79 meters high. The construction of the Mequinenza reservoir together with that of Ribarroja, led to the destruction of the old town of Mequinenza. The rise of water levels flooded its population and the agricultural lands. The Francoist authorities determined to demolish the entire town, including the church. Many of the Mequinenzanos lost their jobs, especially in the coal mines, as the mines were flooded by water. The inhabitants of Mequinenza did not give up and rebuilt a new, more modern and touristic Mequinenza close to the Segre river.

Fishing is probably the greatest tourist attraction for visitors to the "Sea of Aragon" in Mequinenza. From the beginning, it was understood that the Mequinenza reservoir was a powerful source of tourist attraction and the fishing societies rushed to organize their activities. In 1965, 20,000 largemouth bass fry and 175,000 royal carp fry were released. It was the beginning of the great current fish wealth; the reservoir is thought to contain more than 50 million fish. Many fishing guides operate in this area using boats due to the large expanse of water created.

Aiguabarreig Ebro–Segre–Cinca 

At the confluence of the rivers Segre, Cinca, and Ebro near Mequinenza is the Aiguabarreig, an area with great natural richness and a great variety of ecosystems ranging from Mediterranean steppes to impenetrable riverside forests. We can find hundreds of meters wide water with numerous fluvial islands and riverside forests, large masses of reed, pebble beaches, ponds and galleries. It is a point of convergence of the steppe flora coming from the arid zone of Monegros and of the Mediterranean flora that ascends by the Ebro valley. Thanks to these characteristics coexist species of opposite atmospheres. Birds are the most numerous group and range from ardent colonies to all types of birds of prey and desert environments. Reptiles, amphibians and mammals can also be found, especially bats, deer, roe deer, otters and the increasing presence of wild goats.

In the surroundings of Mequinenza, three residential developments and several sports clubs have been established that continuously organize water sports, sailing, canoeing and motor boating competitions, with an increasingly consolidated infrastructure of ports, piers and guard facilities.

Mequinenza also has numerous shops related to fishing and numerous tourist accommodation, and various sports clubs such as Club Capri dedicated to rowing and canoeing in the reservoir. In addition, the town has become an international tourist reference, basing part of its economy on this sector since many rowing and canoeing teams train and carry out preparatory stages in its calm waters (Oxford, Cambridge, German National Olympic Team...). Mequinenza has a stable sheet of water in its rivers that makes it one of the best regatta courses in all Europe.

Local council
Mayor: Magdalena Godía Ibarz, Spanish Socialist Workers' Party (PSOE)

References

External links
 Mequinenza City Council
 Museums of Mequinenza
 Mequinenza Tourism
 Aragón Tourism – Mequinenza

Activities:
 Transebre BTT 
 Triatlon Villa de Mequinenza – Tri La Mina 
 Mequinenza International Film Festival

Clubs:
 Club Capri Mequinenza
 Club Ciclista Mequinenza

 Official Website

Municipalities in the Province of Zaragoza
La Franja